is a train station in the town of Mihama, Chita District, Aichi Prefecture, Japan, operated by Meitetsu.

Lines

Station layout
Kami Noma Station has two elevated opposed side platforms serving two tracks, with Platform 2 on a passing loop. The station building is located underneath. The platforms are short, and can service only trains of six carriages or less. As the number of passengers using this station is small, there are no elevators or escalators for handicapped access to the platforms. The station has automated ticket machines, Manaca automated turnstiles and is unattended..

Platforms

Adjacent stations

Station history
Kami Noma Station was opened on June 30, 1974. In 2007, the Tranpass system of magnetic fare cards with automatic turnstiles was implemented.

Passenger statistics
In fiscal 2018, the station was used by an average of 307 passengers daily.

Bus routes

Surrounding area
Kaminoma Elementary School
Noma Jinja

See also
 List of Railway Stations in Japan

References

External links

 Official web page 

Railway stations in Japan opened in 1974
Railway stations in Aichi Prefecture
Stations of Nagoya Railroad
Mihama, Aichi